Self-arrest is a technique employed in mountaineering in which a climber who has fallen and is sliding down a snow or ice-covered slope arrests the slide by themselves without recourse to a rope or other belay system. Self-arrest can be performed by using ice axe and a combination of a climber's boots, hands, feet, knees and elbows. Use of an ice axe greatly increases the probability of effectively stopping a fall down a snow field, ice field, or glacier.

Techniques
Widely used self-arrest techniques involve placing one's body weight on top of an ice axe to drive the head into the slope. Lack of an ice axe reduces the probability of successful self-arrest.

Effectiveness
The likelihood of being able to self-arrest depends on skills of the climber and three main factors:

 Angle of the slope: The greater the angle of the slope, the harder it is to arrest a slide. On very steep slopes, the chance of effective self-arrest may approach zero.
 Hardness of the slope: The harder the surface of the slope the harder it is to perform self-arrest. On icy slopes (e.g., on an icefall), the pick may fail to engage the surface, or it may bounce with great force on hitting a snag making it difficult to even maintain control of the axe. Negative or neutral angle picks are considered superior by some in this regard as they have a lower tendency to snag on the ice while others maintain that they will not penetrate ice as easily as positive angle picks.
 Speed in performing the maneuver: The longer the delay before the climber starts to put weight on the axe's pick the longer they will freely accelerate down the slope. If the climber is slow to perform the maneuver, by the time they get into the self-arrest position their speed may be high enough to make arrest effectively impossible.

The tip of the pick of the ice axe forms a short blade. When there is positive clearance the downhill point of this blade will engage the ice first when the axe is in arrest position. With negative clearance the uphill point of the blade will engage first. On hard ice, a negative-clearance-axe will skate across the surface when attempting arrest, resulting in very little braking force. This can result in very serious injury and death. A positive-clearance point will dig in aggressively, requiring skill to avoid excessive braking force but giving the climber their best chance to survive.

See also
 Index of climbing topics

References

Pit Schubert, Sicherheit und Risiko in Fels und Eis Band 1 (7th edition), Bergverlag Rother (2005),

External links
Nova self arrest
British Mountaineering Council Video

Mountaineering techniques